Yegor Pitsyk (born 1 February 1995) is a Belarusian professional footballer who plays for Brestzhilstroy.

References

External links 
 
 
 Profile at Dinamo Brest website

1995 births
Living people
Belarusian footballers
Association football midfielders
FC Dynamo Brest players
FC Kobrin players
FC Baranovichi players
FC Granit Mikashevichi players
FC Volna Pinsk players
FC Smorgon players
FC Ivatsevichi players
Sportspeople from Brest, Belarus